Honk is a compilation album by the Rolling Stones, released on 19 April 2019 through Promotone BV and Universal Music. It features tracks from each of their studio albums since 1971. Honk includes all 18 tracks from the 1993 compilation Jump Back. The standard edition includes 36 tracks, while the deluxe edition adds 10 bonus tracks of recent live recordings. The iTunes edition contains the Digital deluxe version tracks along with the deluxe edition's live tracks but with the addition of "Living in a Ghost Town" as the album's first track. It reached the top ten in nine countries, peaking at No. 23 in the US.

Track listing

Single Disc and Vinyl Editions
1. Start Me Up (1981)
2. Brown Sugar (1971)
3. Miss You (1978)
4. Tumbling Dice (1972)
5. Just Your Fool (2016)
6. Fool to Cry (1976)
7. Angie (1973)
8. Beast of Burden (1978)
9. It's Only Rock 'n Roll (But I Like It) (1974)
10. Doom and Gloom (2012)
11. Love Is Strong (1994)
12. Mixed Emotions (1989)
13. Don't Stop (2002)
14. Harlem Shuffle (1986)
15. Happy (1972)
16. Rain Fall Down (2005)
17. Undercover of the Night (1983)
18. Emotional Rescue (1980)
19. Saint Of Me (1997)
20. Wild Horses - featuring Florence Welch (live at London Stadium) (2018)

Charts

Weekly charts

Year-end charts

Certifications

References

2019 compilation albums
The Rolling Stones compilation albums